Mission Santa Clara de Asís is a Spanish mission in the city of Santa Clara, California. The mission, which was the eighth in California, was founded on January 12, 1777, by the Franciscans. Named for Saint Clare of Assisi, who founded the order of the Poor Clares and was an early companion of St. Francis of Assisi, this was the first California mission to be named in honor of a woman.

It is the namesake of both the city and county of Santa Clara, as well as of Santa Clara University, which was built around the mission. This is the only mission located on the grounds of a university campus. Although ruined and rebuilt six times, the settlement was never abandoned, and today it functions as the university chapel for Santa Clara University.

History 

The outpost was originally established as La Misión Santa Clara de Thamien (or Mission Santa Clara de Thamien, a reference to the Tamien people) at the Native American village of So-co-is-u-ka (meaning "Laurelwood", located on the Guadalupe River) on January 12, 1777. There the Franciscan brothers erected a cross and shelter for worship to bring Christianity to the Ohlone people. Floods, fires, and earthquakes damaged many of the early structures and forced relocation to higher ground. The second site is known as Mission Santa Clara de Asís. A subsequent site of the mission dating from 1784 to 1819 is located several hundred yards west of the De La Cruz overpass of the Caltrain track; moreover, several Native American burial sites have been discovered near this subsequent site. The current site, home to the first college in Alta California, dates back to 1828.

Initially, there was tension between the people of the mission and those in the nearby Pueblo de San Josè over disputed ownership rights of land and water. The tension was relieved when a road, the Alameda, was built by two hundred Native Americans to link the communities together. On Sundays, people from San Jose would come to the mission for services, until the building of St. Joseph's Church in 1803. In that year, the mission of Santa Clara reported an Native American population of 1,271. In the same tabular report, its resident priest estimated that 10,000 cattle, 9,500 sheep, 730 horses, 35 mules, and 55 swine were on mission lands, while about 3,000 fanegas of grain (some  each of wheat, barley or corn) had been harvested.

After the Mexican secularization act of 1833 most of the mission's land and livestock was sold off by Mexico. The mission land was subdivided, and the land sold to whoever could afford it which often meant it was sold to government officials and with half of the mission land going to Native Americans. Most of the buildings continued to be used as a parish church, unlike the other missions in California. By 1836, the mission Native Americans were "freed" by the Mexican government. The local land near the mission had drastically changed in the 60 years of mission operation under the Spanish and many of the native plants needed for Native American survival were gone, requiring a change from the former lifestyle for many Native Americans. Many Native Americans fled to the Central Valley of California, others stayed locally and worked for the new ranchos. There were a few small and short-lived Native American villages established around the Bay Area by 1839; many of these villages could not support themselves, so they began raiding the nearby ranchos.

In 1850, California became a state. With that change, priests of the Jesuit order took over the Mission Santa Clara de Asís in 1851 from the Franciscans. Father John Nobili, S.J., was put in charge of the mission. He began a college on the mission site in 1851, which grew into Santa Clara University; it is the only mission to become part of a university, and it is also the oldest university in California. Throughout the history of the mission, the bells have rung faithfully every evening, a promise made to King Charles III of Spain when he sent the original bells to the mission in 1777. He asked that the bells be rung each evening at 8:30 in memory of those who had died, although the actual bells have since been replaced by a recording. The bell tower has three bells; one was donated by King Carlos IV but subsequently destroyed in a fire. King Alphonso XIII donated a replacement bell, which is on display in the de Saisset Museum (in the mission).

In 1861, a new wooden façade with two bell towers was attached over the old adobe front of the building. The interior was widened in 1885 to increase the seating capacity by removing the original adobe nave walls. A fire in 1925 destroyed the structure, including the surrounding wall. The church's parochial functions were transferred to the Saint Clare Parish west of the campus. A rebuilt and restored Mission Santa Clara was consecrated in 1929, when it assumed its primary modern function as chapel and centerpiece of the university campus. It is open to visitors daily; the mission museum is located in the university's De Saisset Museum.
The original mission cemetery, still in use, is located on nearby Lincoln Street.

Santa Clara Mission Cemetery 
Santa Clara Mission Cemetery, also known as Santa Clara Catholic Cemetery, was founded in 1777, alongside the mission by the same Franciscans. In 1851, when Santa Clara College was founded, the cemetery near the mission was running out of space, so they moved the location a few minutes walk from the mission near the adobe home of Fernando Berryessa, son of Maria Zacharias Bernal y Berryessa.

In the 1930s, this cemetery completed its first indoor mausoleum. In part due to the popularity of mausoleum burial, in 2015, they began building the St. Ignatius Outdoor Mausoleum Complex.

Notable burials 
 Peter Hardeman Burnett (1807–1895), judge, the first elected governor of California, serving from December 20, 1849, to January 9, 1851, and the first to resign from office.
 Marv Owen (1906–1991), baseball player for the Detroit Tigers (1931–37), Chicago White Sox (1938–39) and Boston Red Sox (1940) and a baseball coach.
 Cardinal Ignatius Kung Pin-Mei (1901–2000), Catholic Bishop of Shanghai, China, from 1950 until his death in 2000.
 Archbishop Dominic Tang (1908–1995), Chinese Jesuit priest and Bishop in 1951 and later archbishop of Canton.
 Tiburcio Vásquez (1835–1875), Californio bandido who was active in California from 1854 to 1874.

See also 
 Spanish missions in California
 List of Spanish missions in California
 USNS Mission Santa Clara (AO-132) – a Buenaventura-class fleet oiler built during World War II

Notes

References

Citations

Sources

Further reading

External links 

 
 Early photographs, sketches of Mission Santa Clara de Asís, via Calisphere, California Digital Library
 
 

Santa Clara
Buildings and structures in Santa Clara, California
Roman Catholic churches in California
Churches in Santa Clara County, California
California Historical Landmarks
Chapels in the United States
History of Santa Clara, California
Roman Catholic Diocese of San Jose in California
Santa Clara University
1777 establishments in Alta California
1777 in Alta California
Roman Catholic churches completed in 1929
Tourist attractions in Santa Clara, California
Religious organizations established in 1777
20th-century Roman Catholic church buildings in the United States
Cemeteries in Santa Clara County, California